The 2019–20 season was Manchester United's 28th season in the Premier League and their 45th consecutive season in the top flight of English football. The club participated in the Premier League, finishing third, and reached the semi-finals of the FA Cup, the EFL Cup and the UEFA Europa League. The defeat in the Europa League made this United's first hat-trick of trophyless seasons since 1989.

This was United's first full season under manager Ole Gunnar Solskjær, who took permanent charge in March 2019. It is also their first season since 2008–09 without club captain Antonio Valencia, who left the club at the end of the 2018–19 season. Solskjær named Ashley Young as Valencia's successor as club captain. Upon Young's departure for Inter Milan in January 2020, he was replaced as club captain by Harry Maguire.

After being no higher than fifth place in the league since their sixth match in September 2019, United moved up to third place with a draw at home to West Ham United in the penultimate match of the season; they confirmed their third-place finish and a spot in the 2020–21 UEFA Champions League with a 2–0 victory at Leicester City on the final day of the season on 26 July, their 14th consecutive league game without defeat. The season featured a three-month hiatus from March to June 2020 after the outbreak of the global COVID-19 pandemic.

Pre-season and friendlies

United preceded their 2019–20 campaign with a pre-season tour, with matches in Australia, Singapore, China, Norway and Wales. The first two matches were played at the Perth Stadium in Perth, Australia; the first was a 2–0 win over local side Perth Glory, with goals from Marcus Rashford and James Garner, followed by a meeting with historic rivals Leeds United, which the Red Devils won 4–0 thanks to goals from Rashford, Phil Jones, Anthony Martial, as well as a maiden senior goal for Mason Greenwood.

United also took part in the 2019 International Champions Cup. They began with a match against Internazionale in Singapore on 20 July, in which Greenwood scored the only goal to give United a 1–0 win, followed by a match against Tottenham Hotspur in Shanghai five days later, winning 2–1 thanks to goals from Martial and Angel Gomes. They then travelled to Norway to play an additional friendly against Kristiansund BK, the hometown club of Norwegian manager Ole Gunnar Solskjær, winning it 1–0 through an injury-time penalty by Juan Mata. Their final game in the International Champions Cup and final pre-season game saw them play against Milan in Cardiff on 3 August, winning 5–4 in a penalty shoot-out after the match ended in a 2–2 draw, with goals from Rashford and Jesse Lingard; Wales international Daniel James scored the winning penalty.

As a result of the COVID-19 pandemic in the United Kingdom, Premier League football was suspended on 13 March 2020; following the announcement that the league would be resuming in mid-June, United first played an intra-squad friendly match at Old Trafford, before arranging another friendly against Stoke City for 9 June; however, this match was cancelled after Stoke manager Michael O'Neill tested positive for COVID-19. United did eventually return to action on 12 June, playing two matches against West Bromwich Albion behind closed doors at Old Trafford; West Brom won the first match 2–1, but United won the second 3–1.

Premier League

Matches
The Premier League fixtures were announced on 13 June 2019. Manchester United began their season at home to Chelsea on 11 August; a goal in each half from Marcus Rashford, in addition to goals from Anthony Martial and debutant Daniel James, gave United a 4–0 win. United were held to a 1–1 draw by Wolverhampton Wanderers in their next game; Martial opened the scoring with his 50th goal for the club before Rúben Neves equalised with a long-range strike, only for Paul Pogba to miss from the penalty spot midway through the second half. United suffered their first defeat of the season on 24 August, losing 2–1 at home to Crystal Palace. After Jordan Ayew put the Eagles 1–0 up against the run of play with just over half an hour gone, it took until the final minute of normal time for Daniel James to find the equaliser; however, Patrick van Aanholt's injury-time strike gave Palace their first league win over United since May 1991 and their first league win at Old Trafford since December 1989. James continued his goalscoring form in United's final game before the international break away to Southampton, opening the scoring after 10 minutes. Jannik Vestergaard equalised for the home side just before the hour mark, but although Kevin Danso was sent off with 17 minutes to go, United were unable to make their numerical advantage count and the match finished as a 1–1 draw.

United returned to action after the international break with a home game against Leicester City. Marcus Rashford scored the only goal of the game from the penalty spot to give United their first win since the opening day of the season. United's next match, away to West Ham United, ended in a 2–0 defeat, with a goal each from Andriy Yarmolenko and Aaron Cresswell. United then played Arsenal at home; Scott McTominay opened the scoring with his first senior goal at Old Trafford, but Pierre-Emerick Aubameyang was awarded the equaliser after the video assistant referee (VAR) overruled the assistant referee's original decision that he was offside. United's final match before the second international break of the season was away to Newcastle United, who won 1–0 thanks to a goal from Matty Longstaff on his senior debut.

United returned to action after the second international break with a home game against arch-rivals Liverpool. Marcus Rashford opened the scoring after a VAR check, as Victor Lindelöf was ruled not to have fouled Divock Origi. The VAR was used again to check a goal scored by Sadio Mané, which appeared to have come off his arm, and was eventually ruled out for handball. Liverpool did manage to find an equaliser through substitute Adam Lallana in the 85th minute to secure a vital point for both teams. The result meant that United ended Liverpool's winning streak at 18 games. On 27 October 2019, Scott McTominay netted United's recordbreaking 2,000th Premier League goal in a 3–1 victory against Norwich City at Carrow Road. Rashford had a penalty saved by Tim Krul a few minutes later, but scored on United's next attack to put them 2–0 up with less than half an hour played. United were awarded a second penalty for a handball by Todd Cantwell, but despite a change of taker, Krul was able to make another save from Martial. Like Rashford, Martial made amends later by scoring United's third goal. Onel Hernández scored a consolation goal for Norwich City in the 88th minute.

To begin November, United made the trip to Bournemouth, where former United striker Joshua King scored on the stroke of half-time to give Bournemouth a 1–0 win. The result dropped United down to 10th position in the league table and gave Bournemouth their first win since September 2019. United's next home match before the third international break of the season was against Brighton & Hove Albion, where goals from Andreas Pereira (his first of the season), Scott McTominay and Marcus Rashford helped United to a 3–1 win. The second goal was initially given as an own goal by Davy Pröpper, but was later awarded to McTominay. After draws against Sheffield United – which saw Brandon Williams scoring his first senior goal and Mason Greenwood scoring his first Premier League goal – and Aston Villa – saved by Victor Lindelöf's first goal of the season, United won 2–1 against previous season's top four finishers Tottenham Hotspur and champions Manchester City. A draw against Everton was followed by defeat at Watford. Victories against Newcastle United and Burnley brought the club's decade to a close.

The 2020s was started with a defeat at Arsenal on New Year's Day. Ten days later, United recorded their first win of the decade with a 4–0 demolition of Norwich City; Rashford scored twice, Martial and Greenwood scored once each. On the following three league matches the club failed to score, the first two ended in 2–0 defeats; matches against the runaway league leaders Liverpool and a revenge by Burnley, which turned out to be their last defeat of the season, were followed by a goalless draw against Wolverhampton Wanderers. After the newly introduced winter break, United got full 3 points at Chelsea, extending their undefeated run against the West London club to six matches. Watford was the next victim, falling three goals to nil at Old Trafford. The newly recruited Portuguese midfielder Bruno Fernandes scored the first goal from the spot, his first goal for the club. The fixture against Everton was again ended in a 1–1 draw with David de Gea making an error leading up to the home side's goal before Fernandes' equaliser, his first open play goal for United. The next week, United won 2–0 thanks to a Anthony Martial volley and a last minute 40-yard screamer from Scott McTominay to complete their first league double over Manchester City since 2009–10.

Due to the COVID-19 pandemic, Premier League matches were suspended on 13 March, initially only until 3 April 2020. The suspension was made indefinite on 5 April 2020. On 28 May, it was announced that the Premier League would return behind closed doors on 17 June.

The return of the league on 19 June saw United draw 1–1 at Tottenham Hotspur; Fernandes equalised with a penalty kick after Steven Bergwijn's opening goal. In a 3–0 home win against Sheffield United on 24 June, Martial scored his first senior hat-trick, as well as United's first league hat-trick since Robin van Persie did so on 22 April 2013. On 30 June, after the opening goal by Greenwood, Fernandes scored his first brace for United in a 3–0 win against Brighton & Hove Albion. Both players found the net again in the match against Bournemouth; Fernandes scored one after Greenwood made his first league brace. Martial and Rashford scored one each as United won 5–2. On 9 July, both Fernandes and Greenwood scored again, with Paul Pogba adding his first goal of the season in a 3–0 win at Aston Villa. The win made United the first team in Premier League history to win four consecutive games by three goals or more, and the first to do so in the top flight since Liverpool in October 1987. United went behind early in their match against Southampton on 13 July, before Rashford and Martial put them into the lead with two quick goals midway through the first half; however, Michael Obafemi scored a 96th-minute equaliser and the match finished 2–2, denying United an opportunity to jump to third in the table. Away to Crystal Palace, Rashford scored and then assisted Martial's goal as United won 2–0 at Selhurst Park. In this match, defender Timothy Fosu-Mensah made his first start since May 2017. In the penultimate match of the season against West Ham, United went 1–0 down to a Michail Antonio penalty on the stroke of half-time, but Mason Greenwood's equaliser early in the second half salvaged a 1–1 draw that moved United back into the top four for the first time since September 2019. A third-place finish was confirmed on the final day of the season, as a penalty from Bruno Fernandes – the 14th United had been awarded in the league that season (a Premier League record) – and a 98th-minute goal from Jesse Lingard – his first in the league since 22 December 2018 – secured a 2–0 victory away to Leicester City, meaning United finished the season unbeaten in their final 14 matches and qualified for the 2020–21 UEFA Champions League.

League table

FA Cup
As a Premier League side, Manchester United entered the 2019–20 FA Cup in the Third Round Proper. The draw gave United an away tie at fellow Premier League side Wolverhampton Wanderers. The match was played on 4 January 2020 and finished goalless, requiring a replay later that month. The Fourth Round draw took place on 5 January, with United – were they to beat Wolves in their replay – drawn away to either Watford or Tranmere Rovers. The replay was played on 15 January and saw Juan Mata score the only goal of the game to put United through. Playing at Prenton Park against Tranmere, who had eliminated Watford just three days prior, United won 6–0; Harry Maguire and Diogo Dalot both scored their first goals for the club. In the fifth round, United came up against Derby County and former striker Wayne Rooney. In a 3–0 win at Pride Park, Odion Ighalo scored his first brace for United following Luke Shaw's first goal of the season.

After a three-month delay due to the COVID-19 pandemic, the quarter-final tie against Norwich City was played on 27 June 2020. Ighalo opened the scoring before an equaliser from Todd Cantwell. Deep into extra time, Maguire scored to send United to the semi-finals, where they were drawn against Chelsea. Having played against Chelsea in the EFL Cup earlier in the season, it was the first time in seven years that United had faced the same opponents in both domestic cup competitions in one season; the last time was also against Chelsea in 2012–13. However, the FA Cup results on both occasions were same; United succumbed to Chelsea. They suffered their first defeat to the West London club since the 2018 FA Cup Final, as well as ending their 19-game unbeaten run in all competitions.

EFL Cup
As one of the seven English sides competing in UEFA competitions in 2019–20, Manchester United entered the 2019–20 EFL Cup in the third round. The draw for the third round took place on 28 August 2019, and saw United given a home tie against League One side Rochdale. It was only the second time they had met in a competitive, first-team match; their only other meeting was in the third round of the 1985–86 FA Cup, when Manchester United won 2–0. The match was played on 25 September, with Mason Greenwood opening the scoring in the 68th minute; however, 16-year-old Luke Matheson equalised for Rochdale eight minutes later. The match finished at 1–1 after 90 minutes and went straight to penalties; Sergio Romero saved Rochdale's second penalty from Jimmy Keohane, while all Manchester United's kicks were successful, culminating with Daniel James scoring the winning penalty.

In the fourth round, Manchester United were drawn away to Chelsea; it was the sixth time they had met in the competition, most recently in 2012–13, when Chelsea won 5–4 after extra time. Marcus Rashford scored twice to record a 2–1 win, securing their passage to the fifth round and extending their unbeaten run against Chelsea in all competitions to five matches; their last loss to Chelsea was in the 2018 FA Cup Final.

United won their fifth round match against the last surviving non-Premier League club, Colchester United, with goals from Marcus Rashford, Anthony Martial, and an own goal. They were drawn to play local rivals Manchester City in the two-legged semi-final in January. City's 3–1 win in the first leg at Old Trafford was enough to send them to their third successive EFL Cup final, as United were only able to manage a 1–0 win in the second leg at the City of Manchester Stadium.

UEFA Europa League

Group stage
Having finished sixth in the 2018–19 Premier League, Manchester United entered the 2019–20 UEFA Europa League in the group stage. It was the club's first Europa League campaign since winning the competition in 2016–17, and their fourth in nine years, having also played in the knockout phase in 2011–12 and 2015–16. The draw for the group stage took place in Monaco on 30 August 2019; United were drawn into Group L with Kazakhstani side Astana, Serbian club Partizan, and AZ of the Netherlands. Astana were United's – and any English club's – first ever Kazakhstani opponents, and it would also be the first time they had played against AZ; their only previous meeting with Partizan came in the semi-finals of the 1965–66 European Cup, losing 2–0 in Belgrade before a 1–0 win at Old Trafford a week later.

United began their Europa League campaign with a 1–0 win over Astana at Old Trafford on 19 September; Mason Greenwood scored the only goal of the game, the first of his professional career, cutting inside off the right wing to shoot through the legs of goalkeeper Nenad Erić and become Manchester United's youngest goalscorer in European football. United's second match, a goalless draw away to AZ, was played at Cars Jeans Stadion in The Hague as the roof had collapsed at AZ's AFAS Stadion. They then made the trip to Belgrade on 24 October, and came away with a 1–0 win thanks to an Anthony Martial penalty.

Martial was on the scoresheet again in the reverse fixture at Old Trafford on 7 November, his goal coming between efforts from Greenwood and Rashford. The 3–0 win meant United could no longer be caught by third-placed Partizan in the group standings, confirming their qualification for the knockout phase. United fielded a team with an average age of 22 years and 26 days in a 2–1 away defeat to the already-eliminated Astana. The match saw three debutants starting and another three coming on as substitutes. Jesse Lingard captained the side for the first time in his career and scored the opening goal – his first of the season – in the 10th minute; however, a goal from Dmitri Shomko and an own goal by Di'Shon Bernard gave Astana the win. United sealed top spot in the group with a 4–0 victory at home to the already-qualified AZ. Greenwood scored the second and fourth goals, and the others were scored by Ashley Young and Juan Mata, who each scored their first goals of the season; it was Young's first European goal since February 2012, which was scored in the Europa League against another Dutch side, Ajax. It was also United's biggest European victory since the 4–0 Europa League win against yet another Dutch club Feyenoord in November 2016, when they went on to win the tournament.

Knockout phase
Having qualified for the knockout phase as group winners, Manchester United were seeded for the round of 32 draw and paired with Belgian side Club Brugge, who had dropped down from the Champions League; it was their first meeting since the 2015–16 UEFA Champions League play-offs, when Manchester United won 7–1 on aggregate. After a 1–1 draw at Jan Breydel Stadium that saw Anthony Martial cancel out Emmanuel Dennis's opener, United won the return leg 5–0 to win 6–1 on aggregate; Odion Ighalo scored his first goal for the club, Fred scored his first goals of the season, and Scott McTominay scored his first European goal. The round of 16 draw took place on 28 February, with United paired with Austrian club LASK. United won the first leg 5–0. Due to the COVID-19 pandemic, the second leg was played nearly five months later, on 5 August; United went 1–0 down early in the second half, but Jesse Lingard equalised shortly afterwards, before Anthony Martial secured a 2–1 win with three minutes left. That gave United a 7–1 win on aggregate and a place in the quarter-finals.

As a further result of the pandemic, the quarter-finals, semi-finals and final of the competition were moved to four venues in the German state of North Rhine-Westphalia, with all matches to be played behind closed doors. The draw for the entire final stage was also performed at the same time on 10 July. The draw paired Manchester United with Danish side Copenhagen in the quarter-finals, and the match was goalless through the initial 90 minutes, before ultimately being decided by a Bruno Fernandes penalty five minutes into extra time. In the semi-finals, they would play against the winners of the match between Wolverhampton Wanderers and Sevilla, played the next day; Sevilla also won 1–0, setting up the semi-final to be played in Cologne on 16 August. United lost 2–1 despite taking the lead through a Bruno Fernandes penalty in the ninth minute.

Squad statistics

Statistics accurate as of 16 August 2020.

Transfers

In

Out

Loan in

Loan out

Notes

References

Manchester United F.C. seasons
Manchester United
Manchester United